Adam Montefiore (born 10 November 1957 in London) is a British-born Israeli wine trade veteran, wine critic and wine writer.

Biography
Adam Sebag Montefiore was born in Kensington, London. His father was Stephen Eric Sebag-Montefiore, descended from a line of wealthy Sephardi Jews who were diplomats and bankers in Italy and Morocco. He is the brother of Hugh Sebag-Montefiore, a writer, Rupert Sebag-Montefiore, ex chairman of Savills estate agents and Simon Sebag-Montefiore, a historian. He was educated at Wellesley House and Wellington College.

Montefiore immigrated to Israel in 1989. He lives in Ra'anana, north of Tel Aviv. He was married for 33 years to Gillian (Jill) Leah Montefiore, who died in 2015.  He has three children, Dr. Liam Murphy Sebag-Montefiore, David Jonathan Montefiore and Rachel Leah Montefiore, and six grandchildren.

Wine career
Adam Montefiore is a specialist in Israeli wine. He has been referred to as 'The Ambassador of Israeli Wine,' and 'The English Voice of Israeli Wine.' He is the wine writer for the Jerusalem Post and has written books on Israeli wine.

Montefiore worked for Charrington (Bass Charrington) and Crest Hotels (Bass Hotels & Resorts)[ in the UK, starting in beer and moving into wine. He studied wine at the WSET and was a Founder and later Honorary member of The Academy of Wine Service. He first started working with Israeli wine in the 1980s, helping Yarden, Gamla and Golan wines gain a foothold in the UK. After moving to Israel in 1989, he worked for Israeli wineries for twenty six years. In the 1990s he worked for the Golan Heights Winery.  In the 2000s he worked with Carmel Winery and Yatir Winery. He founded Handcrafted Wines of Israel and played a significant role in the development of Israeli wines. .

He has been the wine writer of The Jerusalem Post  since 2010. He also writes about wine for the Jewish Chronicle and www.wines-israel.com . He contributes to Hugh Johnson's Pocket Wine Book, Oz Clarke's Wine A to Z, The World Atlas of Wine, The Sotheby's Wine Encyclopedia and writes the section on Israel and Kosher for Jancis Robinson MW's Oxford Companion to Wine. He is a member of The Circle of Wine Writers.

Currently, he is CEO of Adam Montefiore Wine Consultancy  and partner of The Israel Wine Experience  , which educates about Israeli wine.

Published works
The Book of New Israeli Food, 2007, with Janna Gur
The Wine Route of Israel, 2012, with Eliezer Sacks
Wines of Israel, 2012, with Eliezer Sacks
 The Wine Route of Israel, 2015, with Eliezer Sacks
 Shvill Ha'Yayin, 2016, with Eliezer Sacks
Wines of Israel, 2020, with Eliezer Sacks
Domaine du Castel: The Biography, 2023

References

Further reading

 http://winesisrael.com/en/3497/adam-montefiore-leaves-carmel/
 http://winesisrael.com/en/3678/new-beginnings/
 https://www.jpost.com/Author/Adam-Montefiore-Wine-Talk

Living people
1957 births
Wine critics
Israeli wine
Sebag-Montefiore family